Spolia (Latin: 'spoils') is repurposed building stone for new construction or decorative sculpture reused in new monuments. It is the result of an ancient and widespread practice whereby stone that has been quarried, cut and used in a built structure is carried away to be used elsewhere. The practice is of particular interest to historians, archaeologists and architectural historians since the gravestones, monuments and architectural fragments of antiquity are frequently found embedded in structures built centuries or millennia later. The archaeologist Philip A. Barker gives the example of a late Roman period (probably 1st-century) tombstone from Wroxeter that could be seen to have been cut down and undergone weathering while it was in use as part of an exterior wall and, possibly as late as the 5th century, reinscribed for reuse as a tombstone.

Overview

The practice was common in late antiquity.  Entire obsolete structures, including underground foundations, are known to have been demolished to enable the construction of new structures.  According to Baxter, two churches in Worcester  (one 7th century and one 10th) are thought to have been deconstructed so that their building stone could be repurposed by St. Wulstan to construct a cathedral in 1084.  And the parish churches of Atcham, Wroxeter, and Upton Magna are largely built of stone taken from the buildings of Viroconium Cornoviorum.

Roman examples include the Arch of Janus, the earlier imperial reliefs reused on the Arch of Constantine, the colonnade of Old Saint Peter's Basilica; examples in Byzantine territories include the exterior sculpture on the Panagia Gorgoepikoos church in Athens); in the medieval West Roman tiles were reused in St Albans Cathedral, in much of the medieval architecture of Colchester, porphyry columns in the Palatine Chapel in Aachen, and the colonnade of the basilica of Santa Maria in Trastevere. Spolia in the medieval Islamic world include the columns in the hypostyle mosques of Kairouan, Gaza and Cordoba. Although the modern literature on spolia is primarily concerned with these and other medieval examples, the practice is common and there is probably no period of art history in which evidence for "spoliation" could not be found.

Interpretations of spolia generally alternate between the "ideological" and the "pragmatic." Ideological readings might describe the re-use of art and architectural elements from former empires or dynasties as triumphant (that is, literally as the display of "spoils" or "booty" of the conquered) or as revivalist (proclaiming the renovation of past imperial glories). Pragmatic readings emphasize the utility of re-used materials: if there is a good supply of old marble columns available, for example, there is no need to produce new ones. The two approaches are not mutually exclusive, and there is certainly no one approach that can account for all instances of spoliation, as each instance must be evaluated within its particular historical context.

Spolia had apotropaic spiritual value. Clive Foss has noted that in the 5th century crosses were inscribed on the stones of pagan buildings, as at Ankara, where crosses were inscribed on the walls of the Temple of Augustus and Rome. Foss suggests that the purpose of this was to ward off the daimones that lurked in stones that had been consecrated to pagan usage. Liz James extends Foss's observation in noting that statues, laid on their sides and facing outwards, were carefully incorporated in Ankara's city walls in the 7th century, at a time when spolia were also being built into city walls in Miletus, Sardis, Ephesus and Pergamum: "laying a statue on its side places it and the power it represents under control. It is a way of acquiring the power of rival gods for one's own benefit," James observes. "Inscribing a cross works similarly, sealing the object for Christian purposes".

Gallery

See also

Crisis of the 3rd Century
Roman Empire#Tetrarchy (285–324) and Constantine the Great (324-337)
Dominate
Palimpsest, the practice of erasing old texts from scarce old vellum to write new text
Diocletian's Palace, a Roman Imperial palace in Split, re-purposed by later inhabitants as a town
Slighting

References

Further reading 
There is a large modern literature on spolia, and the following list makes no claim to be comprehensive.
J. Alchermes, "Spolia in Roman Cities of the Late Empire: Legislative Rationales and Architectural Reuse," Dumbarton Oaks Papers 48 (1994), 167–78.
S. Bassett, The urban image of late antique Constantinople (Cambridge, 2004).
L. Bosman, The power of tradition: Spolia in the architecture of St. Peter's in the Vatican (Hilversum, 2004).
B. Brenk, "Spolia from Constantine to Charlemagne: Aesthetics versus Ideology," Dumbarton Oaks Papers 41 (1987), 103–09.
B. Brenk, "Sugers Spolien," Arte Medievale 1 (1983), 101–107.
R. Brilliant, "I piedistalli del giardino di Boboli: spolia in se, spolia in re," Prospettiva 31 (1982), 2–17.
C. Bruzelius, "Columpnas marmoreas et lapides antiquarum ecclesiarum: The Use of Spolia in the Churches of Charles II of Anjou," in Arte d'Occidente: temi e metodi. Studi in onore di Angiola Maria Romanini (Rome, 1999), 187–95.
F.W. Deichmann, Die Spolien in der spätantike Architektur (Munich, 1975).
J. Elsner, "From the Culture of Spolia to the Cult of Relics: The Arch of Constantine and the Genesis of Late Antique Forms," Papers of the British School at Rome 68 (2000), 149–84.
A. Esch, "Spolien: Zum Wiederverwendung antike Baustücke und Skulpturen in mittelalterlichen Italien," Archiv für Kunstgeschichte 51 (1969), 2–64.
F.B. Flood, "The Medieval Trophy as an Art Historical Trope: Coptic and Byzantine 'Altars' in Islamic Contexts," Muqarnas 18 (2001).
J.M. Frey, Spolia in Fortifications and the Common Builder in Late Antiquity (Leiden, 2016)
M. Greenhalgh, The Survival of Roman Antiquities in the Middle Ages (London, 1989). (Available online, provided by author)
M. Greenhalgh, "Spolia in fortifications: Turkey, Syria and North Africa," in Ideologie e pratiche del reimpiego nell'alto medioevo (Settimane di Studi del Centro Italiano di Studi sull'Alto Medioevo 46), (Spoleto, 1999). (Available online, provided by author)
M. Fabricius Hansen, The eloquence of appropriation: prolegomena to an understanding of spolia in early Christian Rome (Rome, 2003).
B. Kiilerich, "Making Sense of the Spolia in the Little Metropolis in Athens," 'Arte medievale n.s. anno IV, 2, 2005, 95-114.
B. Kiilerich, "Antiquus et modernus: Spolia in Medieval Art - Western, Byzantine and Islamic", in Medioevo: il tempo degli antichi, ed. A.C. Quintavalle, Milan 2006,135-145.
D. Kinney, "Spolia from the Baths of Caracalla in Sta. Maria in Trastevere," Art Bulletin 68 (1986), 379–97.
D. Kinney, "Rape or Restitution of the Past? Interpreting Spolia," in S.C. Scott, ed., The Art of Interpreting (University Park, 1995), 52–67.
D. Kinney, "Making Mute Stones Speak: Reading Columns in S. Nicola in Carcere and S. Maria Antiqua," in C.L. Striker, ed., Architectural Studies in Memory of Richard Krautheimer (Mainz, 1996), 83–86.
D. Kinney, "Spolia. Damnatio and renovatio memoriae," Memoirs of the American Academy in Rome 42 (1997), 117–148.
D. Kinney, "Roman Architectural Spolia," Proceedings of the American Philosophical Society 145 (2001), 138–161.
D. Kinney, "Spolia," in W. Tronzo, ed., St. Peter's in the Vatican (Cambridge, 2005), 16–47.
D. Kinney, "The concept of Spolia," in C. Rudolph, ed., A Companion to Medieval Art: Romanesque and Gothic in Northern Europe (Oxford, 2006), 233–52.
L. de Lachenal, Spolia: uso e rempiego dell'antico dal III al XIV secolo (Milan, 1995).
P. Liverani, "Reimpiego senza ideologia: la lettura antica degli spolia dall’arco di Costantino all’età carolingia," Römische Mitteilungen 111 (2004), 383–434.
J. Lomax, "Spolia as Property," Res Publica Litterarum 20 (1997), 83–94.
S. Lorenzatti, Vicende del Tempio di venere e Roma nel medioevo e nel Rinascimento, in "Rivista dell’Istituto Nazionale di Archeologia e storia dell’Arte",13. 1990, pp. 119–138.
C. Mango, "Ancient Spolia in the Great Palace of Constantinople," in Byzantine East, Latin West. Art Historical Studies in Honor of Kurt Weitzmann (Princeton, 1995), 645–57.
H.-R. Meier, "Vom Siegeszeichen zum Lüftungsschacht: Spolien als Erinnerungsträger in der Architektur," in: Hans-Rudolf Meier und Marion Wohlleben (eds.), Bauten und Orte als Träger von Erinnerung: Die Erinnerungsdebatte und die Denkmalpflege (Zürich: Institut für Denkmalpflege der ETH Zürich, 2000), 87–98. (pdf)
 M. Muehlbauer, "From Stone to Dust: The Life of the Kufic Inscribed Frieze of Wuqro Cherqos in Tigray, Ethiopia," Muqarnas 38 (2021), 1-34.
R. Müller, Spolien und Trophäen im mittelalterlichen Genua: sic hostes Ianua frangit (Weimar, 2002).
J. Poeschke and H. Brandenburg, eds., Antike Spolien in der Architektur des Mittelalters und der Renaissance (Munich, 1996).
H. Saradi, "The Use of Spolia in Byzantine Monuments: the Archaeological and Literary Evidence," International Journal of the Classical Tradition 3 (1997), 395–423.
Annette Schäfer, Spolien: Untersuchungen zur Übertragung von Bauteilen und ihr politischer Symbolgehalt am Beispiel von St-Denis, Aachen und Magdeburg (M.A. thesis, Bamberg, 1999).
S. Settis, “Continuità, distanza, conoscenza: tre usi dell’antico,” in S. Settis, ed., Memoria dell’antico nell’arte italiana (Torino, 1985), III.373–486.
B. Ward-Perkins, From Classical Antiquity to the Middle Ages: Urban Public Building in Northern and Central Italy A.D. 300–850 (Oxford, 1984)

Ancient Roman architectural elements
Recycling
Latin words and phrases
Building stone